Andreu Veà, Ph.D. (1969 in Sant Feliu de Guíxols, Girona, Spain), is an engineer, president of the Internet Society (ISOC-ES) and member of the advisory board of the Internet Hall of Fame.

He has been appointed as Digital Champion for Spain in late 2014. Digital Champions are ambassadors for the Digital Agenda, appointed by their Members States to help every European become digital and reporting to the European Commission.

For all his activities, in 2017 he has been awarded with the "National Internet Personal-Trajectory Prize", summoned and failed by the Internet Day Impulse Committee, made up of more than 60 social Spanish organizations led by the Association of Internet Users. The prize is given by the President of the Senate of Spain during the World Internet Day (May 17), at the Spanish Senate Palace.

Born in Sant Feliu de Guíxols (Girona, Spain) in 1969. Telecom Engineer (’91) and Electronic Engineer (’93), Andreu Veà has an MBA in IT Management and a Ph.D. in computer networks ('02). He had his first computer (with 3KB memory) at the age of twelve, and his first international computer network experience dates from 1986. He's brother of the scientist and primatologist Joaquim Veà Baró (1958-2016).

Since 1992, he has had the word Internet on his business card, working in the private sector, in public administration, and at the university, where he has shared his knowledge with several generations of engineers. He discovered the magic power of the net early on, contributing to the local development of the incipient Spanish market in the mid ‘90s, providing first-time connections to many companies and individuals. He co-founded the 4th Spanish Internet service provider (ISP) in 1994.

In early 1998 the new telco Retevision recruited him to launch their own ISP (iddeo). There he designed the technical system that allowed this network operator to offer the first free access to the Internet and a year later the first flat telephone rate in Spain, doubling the base of Internet users in the country in less than a year.

He is a great defender of the methods and uses of the Internet, antagonistic to the «classic PTT-telco way». He promoted and presided over ESPANIX (the major Spanish Internet exchange point) and the installation in Madrid and Barcelona of one of the 13 DNS global root servers.
After his doctoral dissertation thesis on the technology, history, and social structure of the Internet (which for 8 years was one of the top 25 most downloaded, 260,000 copies), he was invited by Vint Cerf (one of the “fathers of the Internet”) to continue his original research at Stanford University (California, USA), from which he launched the international research program WiWiW.org.

Nowadays he contributes to the launching and soft-landing of technology-based companies in Silicon Valley. He has been elected as Eminent Expert for Spain on the Grand Jury at the UNESCO’s World Summit Award (Global Awards for mobile apps).

He is the founder and current President of the Spanish chapter of the Internet Society (ISOC-ES) and is the only European to be selected to serve on the advisory board of the Internet Hall of Fame.

His next challenges are focused on helping to connect the next 5 billion inhabitants on earth to the Internet and to improve the quality of life of people in the less favored areas of the planet through the intensive, pervasive and nomadic use of the Internet.

Published works 

.

References

External links 

National Internet Personal-Trajectory Prize 2017 "Acceptance Speech" http://ComoCreamosInternet.com  Retrieved 15 June 2017.

CERF, et al. http://ComoCreamosInternet.com  2013 [accessdate: 14 January 2014].
ICANNWIKI on Andreu Veà https://icannwiki.org/Andreu_Vea  [accessdate: 19 February 2014]

Internet pioneers
Engineers from Catalonia
1969 births
Living people
Articles containing video clips